Dorze is an Afro-Asiatic language spoken in the Gamo Gofa Zone of Ethiopia. Alemayehu Abebe reports that while performing preliminary fieldwork in 1992, he found 14 kebeles in Chencha woreda with Dorze speakers.

Notes

See also 
 Dorze people

North Omotic languages
Languages of Ethiopia